Her Final Reckoning is a lost 1918 American silent drama film directed by Émile Chautard and written by Jules Claretie and Charles E. Whittaker. The film stars Pauline Frederick, John Miltern, Robert Cain, Warren Cook, Joseph W. Smiley, and James Laffey. The film was released on June 23, 1918, by Paramount Pictures.

Plot
As described in a film magazine, Marsa (Frederick), daughter of a Russian nobleman whose wealth she inherits, meets and falls in love with Prince Zilah (Miltern) in Paris. Between them rises the shadow of a secret, the nature of which is revealed, with Count Menko (Cain) hurrying to Paris upon learning of Marsa's engagement to the Prince. The Count orders her to meet him in the garden. She turns her dogs loose on him and he is badly injured and disappears for a time. The Count sends a packet of love letters to the Prince on the eve of the marriage. Marsa becomes ill and loses her mind. A friend of Prince runs down the Count and kills him in a duel. The Prince and Marsa are reconciled.

Cast
Pauline Frederick as Marsa
John Miltern as Prince Zilah
Robert Cain as Count Menko
Warren Cook as Count Varhely 
Joseph W. Smiley as Doctor Forg 
James Laffey as Doctor Charcot
Karl Dane as Prince Tcheretoff
Florence Beresford as Marquis de Nati
Louis Reinhard as Marsa's Butler
Edith Ellwood as Marsa's Maid

Reception
Like many American films of the time, Her Final Reckoning was subject to restrictions and cuts by city and state film censorship boards. For example, the Chicago Board of Censors issued an Adults Only permit and cut, in Reel 2, the intertitle "At midnight this key will bring me your presence and you shall have your letters back, if —".

References

External links 
 
 

1918 films
1910s English-language films
Silent American drama films
1918 drama films
Paramount Pictures films
Films directed by Emile Chautard
American black-and-white films
Lost American films
American silent feature films
1918 lost films
Lost drama films
1910s American films